The 51st Texas Legislature met from January 11, 1949, to July 6, 1949. All members present during this session were elected in the 1948 general elections.

Sessions

Regular Session: January 11, 1949 - July 6, 1949

Party summary

Senate

House

Officers

Senate
 Lieutenant Governor: Allan Shivers (D) until September 1, 1949.  Upon the death of Governor Beauford H. Jester, he became Governor and the Office of Lieutenant Governor was vacant.
 President Pro Tempore: Kyle Vick (D)
George C. Morris (D)
Grady Hazlewood (D)
Wardlow W. Lane (D)

House
 Speaker of the House: Durwood Manford (D)

Members

Senate

Dist. 1
 Howard A. Carney (D), Atlanta

Dist. 2
 Wardlow Lane (D), Center

Dist. 3
 Ottis E. Lock (D), Lufkin

Dist. 4
 W. R. Cousins, Jr. (D), Beaumont

Dist. 5
 Mrs. Neveille H. Colson (D), Navasota

Dist. 6
 James E. Taylor (D), Kerens

Dist. 7
 Warren McDonald (D), Tyler

Dist. 8
 A. Aiken, Jr. (D), Paris

Dist. 9
 Charles R. Jones (D), Bonham

Dist. 10
 G. C. Morris (D), Greenville

Dist. 11
 Fred Harris (D), Dallas

Dist. 12
 Crawford Martin (D), Hillsboro

Dist. 13
 Kyle Vick (D), Waco

Dist. 14
 William T. "Bill" Moore (D), Bryan

Dist. 15
 Gus J. Strauss (D), Hallettsville

Dist. 16
 Searcy Bracewell (D), Houston

Dist. 17
 Jimmy Phillips (D), Angleton

Dist. 18
 John J. Bell (D), Cuero

Dist. 19
 R. A. Weinert (D), Seguin

Dist. 20
 Carlos Ashley (D), Llano

Dist. 21
 W. A. Shofner (D), Temple

Dist. 22
 R. L. Proffer (D), Justin

Dist. 23
 George Moffett (D), Chillicothe

Dist. 24
 Pat Bullock (D), Colorado City

Dist. 25
 Dorsey B. Hardeman (D), San Angelo

Dist. 26
 Walter Tynan (D), San Antonio

Dist. 27
 Rogers Kelly (D), Edinburg

Dist. 28
 Keith Kelly (D), Fort Worth

Dist. 29
 Hill D. Hudson (D), Pecos

Dist. 30
 Kilmer B. Corbin (D), Lamesa

Dist. 31
 Grady Hazlewood (D), Amarillo

House
The House was composed of 150 Democrats.

House members included future Governors Preston Smith and Dolph Briscoe, and future Congressmen Jack Brooks, Bob Casey, Abraham Kazen and J.T. Rutherford.

Sources
 Texas Almanac and State Industrial Guide, 1949-51. A.H. Belo Corporation, Dallas, Texas.

External links

51st Texas Legislature
1949 in Texas
1949 U.S. legislative sessions